Rakesh Pandey may refer to:

Rakesh Pandey (actor), Indian actor
 Rakesh Pandey (author), Indian writer and author
Rakesh Pandey (UP politician), Uttar Pradesh politician and MP born in 1952
Rakesh Pandey (Punjab politician), Punjab politician born in 1955